Kildall may refer to:

Gary Arlen Kildall (1942–1994), American computer scientist and microcomputer entrepreneur, inventor of operating system CP/M, founder of Digital Research, KnowledgeSet and Prometheus Light and Sound
Dorothy Kildall née McEwen (1943–2005), co-founder of Digital Research
Scott Kildall (1969–), American conceptual artist and performer